Shaheding Station is a station of Guangzhou Metro Line 6. It is located underground in Tianhe District. It started operation on 28 December 2013.

Station layout

Exits

References

Railway stations in China opened in 2013
Guangzhou Metro stations in Tianhe District